Dysderina is a genus of goblin spider.

Species

 Dysderina abdita Chickering, 1968
 Dysderina amaca Platnick, Berniker & Bonaldo, 2013
 Dysderina ayo Platnick, Berniker & Bonaldo, 2013
 Dysderina baehrae Platnick, Berniker & Bonaldo, 2013
 Dysderina belinda Chickering, 1968
 Dysderina bimucronata Simon, 1893
 Dysderina caeca Birabén, 1954
 Dysderina capensis Simon, 1907
 Dysderina concinna Chickering, 1968
 Dysderina craigi Platnick, Berniker & Bonaldo, 2013
 Dysderina craneae Chickering, 1968
 Dysderina cunday Platnick, Berniker & Bonaldo, 2013
 Dysderina desultrix (Keyserling, 1881)
 Dysderina dura Chickering, 1951
 Dysderina erwini Platnick, Berniker & Bonaldo, 2013
 Dysderina excavata Platnick, Berniker & Bonaldo, 2013
 Dysderina furtiva Chickering, 1968
 Dysderina globina Chickering, 1968
 Dysderina globosa (Keyserling, 1877)
 Dysderina granulosa Simon & Fage, 1922
 Dysderina humphreyi Chickering, 1968
 Dysderina improvisa Chickering, 1968
 Dysderina insularum Roewer, 1963
 Dysderina intempina Chickering, 1968
 Dysderina keyserlingi Simon, 1907
 Dysderina machinator (Keyserling, 1881)
 Dysderina matamata Platnick, Berniker & Bonaldo, 2013
 Dysderina meridina Chickering, 1968
 Dysderina montana (Keyserling, 1883)
 Dysderina obtina Chickering, 1968
 Dysderina perarmata Fage & Simon, 1936
 Dysderina plena Packard-Cambridge, 1894
 Dysderina potena Chickering, 1968
 Dysderina princeps Simon, 1891
 Dysderina principalis (Keyserling, 1881)
 Dysderina propinqua (Keyersling, 1881)
 Dysderina purpurea Simon, 1893
 Dysderina recondita Chickering, 1951
 Dysderina rigida Chickering, 1968
 Dysderina rugosa Bristowe, 1938
 Dysderina sacha Platnick, Berniker & Bonaldo, 2013
 Dysderina sasaima Platnick, Berniker & Bonaldo, 2013
 Dysderina scutata (Packard-Cambridge, 1876)
 Dysderina seclusa Chickering, 1951
 Dysderina silvatica Chickering, 1951
 Dysderina similis (Keyserling, 1881)
 Dysderina simla Chickering, 1968
 Dysderina soltina Chickering, 1968
 Dysderina speculifera Simon, 1907
 Dysderina straba Fage, 1936
 Dysderina sublaevis Simon, 1907
 Dysderina termitophila Bristowe, 1938
 Dysderina tiputini Platnick, Berniker & Bonaldo, 2013
 Dysderina urucu Platnick, Berniker & Bonaldo, 2013
 Dysderina watina Chickering, 1968
 Dysderina zinona'' Chickering, 1968

References
Encyclopedia of Life entry

Oonopidae
Araneomorphae genera
Spiders of Asia
Spiders of Africa
Spiders of South America